Windsor Theatre is the former name of the 48th Street Theatre in New York.

Windsor Theatre may also refer to:

Windsor Theatre, Brighton, a cinema in Adelaide, South Australia
Windsor Theatre, Hilton, an historic cinema in Adelaide, South Australia
Windsor Theatre, Hindmarsh, an historic cinema in Adelaide, South Australia
Windsor Theatre, Lockleys, an historic cinema in Adelaide, South Australia
Windsor Theatre, St Morris, an historic cinema in Adelaide, South Australia

See also
Theatre Royal, Windsor, a theatre in Windsor, UK